Myagmaryn Delgerkhüü (born 21 September 1996) is a Mongolian swimmer. He competed in the men's 50 metre butterfly event at the 2017 World Aquatics Championships. In 2019, he represented Mongolia at the 2019 World Aquatics Championships held in Gwangju, South Korea and he finished in 72nd place in the heats in the men's 50 metre freestyle event. In the men's 100 metre freestyle he finished in 92nd place in the heats.

References

External links
 

1996 births
Living people
Mongolian male swimmers
Place of birth missing (living people)
Swimmers at the 2014 Asian Games
Asian Games competitors for Mongolia
Male butterfly swimmers
Mongolian male freestyle swimmers
Swimmers at the 2020 Summer Olympics
Olympic swimmers of Mongolia
21st-century Mongolian people
20th-century Mongolian people